The women's taijiquan competition at the 1994 Asian Games in Hiroshima, Japan was held on 14 October at the Aki Ward Sports Center.

Schedule

Results

References 

Women's_taijiquan